São Paulo (English: Saint Paul) is a former parish (freguesia) in the municipality of Lisbon, Portugal. At the administrative reorganization of Lisbon on 8 December 2012 it became part of the parish Misericórdia.

Main sites
Valada-Azambuja Palace
Almada – Carvalhais Palace
Alvito Palace
Sandomil Palace
Chagas Palace
Corpo Santo Church
Igreja de São Paulo
Cais do Sodré Station
24 de Julho Market

External links

 São Paulo's parish website

References 

Former parishes of Lisbon